Konyaspor Basket was a Turkish professional basketball team from the city of Konya.

History
The club was founded by Selçuk University in 1987.

In August 2014 the club changed its name to Konyaspor Basketbol in order to gain more support from the citizens of Konya and fangroups from Konyaspor. The club has no ties to the football club of Konya but only changed its for better sponsorship and fangroups reasons.

History
 Mutlu Aku Selcuk Universitesi (–2012)
 Torku Selcuk Universitesi (2012–2014)
 Torku Konyaspor (2014–2015)
 Konyaspor Basketbol Kulubu (2015–2016)

Season by season

Players

Notable players

  Yunus Çankaya
 - Ekene Ibekwe
  Kevin Braswell
  Sean Williams
  Troy DeVries
  Warren Carter
  Hakim Warrick
  Tomas Delininkaitis

References

External links
Official Website
Eurobasket.com page
Unofficial blog
Club History
TBLStat.net Team Profile 

Basketball teams in Turkey
Basketball teams established in 1987
1987 establishments in Turkey
Sport in Konya